Atila Turan (born 10 April 1992) is a professional footballer who plays for Turkish TFF Second League club Kocaelispor. Born in France, he represents the Turkey national team internationally, having played for France at youth international levels U16 through U19 before switching to the Turkey U21. He plays mainly as a left midfielder, but is also capable of playing as a left-back.

Club career

Grenoble
Of Turkish origin, Turan was born in Migennes and played youth football for two amateur clubs in the Yonne department before securing a move to professional club Grenoble in July 2008. After three years in the club's youth academy, on 3 February 2010, he signed his first professional contract, agreeing to a three-year deal. Turan made his professional debut on 30 July 2010 in a 2–1 defeat to Guingamp in a Coupe de la Ligue match. He made his first Ligue 2 appearance the following week in a 1–0 win over Le Havre.

Turan scored his first professional goal on 29 October 2010, netting the equalizing goal in a 1–1 home draw against Ajaccio. A week later, he scored his second career goal in a 4–3 defeat to Châteauroux. Turan finished his debut campaign with 24 total appearances and three goals as Grenoble finished the season last, which led to a second consecutive relegation to the Championnat National, the third level of French football.

Sporting CP
Despite Grenoble's performance during the 2010–11 season, Turan earned individual praise for his performances and was, subsequently, scouted by several clubs abroad, most notably Spanish club Barcelona and Italian club Fiorentina. On 24 June 2011, Turan confirmed to Portuguese radio station Rádio Renascença that he was in negotiations with Sporting Clube de Portugal, however, due to the lengthy judicial process that led to the liquidation of Grenoble being in session, both the club and player were unable to further talks. A month later, after the liquidation of Grenoble was announced, the move was confirmed and Turan was introduced as a Sporting CP player. He signed a five-year contract with the Lisbon club, which included a minimum fee release clause of €30 million.

After failing to make a competitive appearance with Sporting, on 31 August 2011, Turan was loaned to fellow Primeira Liga team S.C. Beira-Mar until the end of the season. On 15 October, he made his debut for Beira-Mar in a 1–0 defeat to Marítimo in the Portuguese Cup. A week later, Turan made his league debut appearing as a substitute in a defeat to Benfica.

In June 2017 Turan joined Kayserispor.

International career
Turan was a France youth international having earned caps at under-16, under-17, under-18, and under-19 level. With the under-17 team, he played at the 2009 UEFA European Under-17 Football Championship. In February 2013, he was called up to the Turkish under-21 team for a match against Norway.

Turan made his senior debut for the senior Turkey national team in a friendly –2-0 loss to Romania on 9 November 2017.

Career statistics

Club

Notes

References

External links

1992 births
Living people
Turkish footballers
Turkey international footballers
Turkey under-21 international footballers
French people of Turkish descent
French footballers
France youth international footballers
Association football defenders
Association football midfielders
Süper Lig players
Primeira Liga players
Liga Portugal 2 players
Ligue 1 players
Ligue 2 players
TFF First League players
TFF Second League players
Grenoble Foot 38 players
Sporting CP footballers
Sporting CP B players
S.C. Beira-Mar players
Orduspor footballers
Stade de Reims players
Kayserispor footballers
MKE Ankaragücü footballers
Kocaelispor footballers
French expatriate footballers
Turkish expatriate footballers
Expatriate footballers in Portugal
Turkish expatriate sportspeople in France
Turkish expatriate sportspeople in Portugal